The Flora Hiperspectral satellite, initially scheduled to launch in 2017, is a proposed Brazilian–American earth observation satellite. It will produce hyperspectral surface images of comparable resolution to Landsat satellites. The Flora Hiperspectral is a joint project between the Jet Propulsion Laboratory (JPL) of NASA and the National Institute for Space Research of Brazil.

Objective
This mission will produce the first time in orbit, hyperspectral images with a spatial resolution and global coverage comparable to that of the Landsat satellite and CBERS program. Data will study the biochemical and biophysical properties of soil cover and the action of man (for example, deforestation and fires) on ecosystem functioning.

Hyperspectral data are obtained in narrow strips, contiguous and in sufficient number to build spectra similar to the laboratory. Indicate biochemical characteristics (e.g., nutrient levels, moisture) and biophysical plants. Detect water stress, diseases, or difficulties in adapting to the ground culture. They measure of mineral absorption in exposed surfaces of rocks. In coastal and inland waters, measure chlorophyll and suspended sediment. The satellite monitoring currently only allows to observe if there is forest or not. The Plant will be able to check the chemical and physical characteristics of the vegetation, which today no satellite can do. According to reports, it will be 10 times more advanced than any satellite of the same type.

JPL will provide an instrument, which cost 150 million dollars and Brazil come with providing about US$110 million, concerning a part of the satellite and part of the launch.

Instruments
High spectral resolution camera (200 bands between 400 and 2500 nm along a 150 km swath.
Spatial resolution is 30 meters, with 14 bits quantization.

See also

 Brazilian space program

References

Earth imaging satellites
Proposed satellites
Earth observation satellites of Brazil
Earth observation satellites of the United States